The Saint Joseph the Patriarch Church also known as Archdiocesan Shrine of Saint Joseph the Patriarch is a church located in the town center of San Jose, Batangas in the Philippines. The church is known for being one of the parishes that Fr. Manuel Blanco O.S.A, who authored the Flora de Filipinas, administered.

Church history
Fr. Jose Victoria built the church in 1762. The Augustinian Chapter of May 9, 1767 named Fr. Agustin Horbegozo as the town's parish priest. Fr. Tomas Cañón replaced the old structure with one made of lime and pebbles. In 1790 the archbishop of Manila ordered the parish church of Batangas to give one of its old, dismantled retablos to San Jose.  Fr. Manuel Blanco in 1812 replace the original buildings with new ones made of masonry, he constructed the convento and began the work on the present church, but left in 1816 without seeing it completed. The church roof went up in flames in 1847 and was changed to tile in 1849 by Fray Marcos Anton. A fire damaged both the church and convento in 1857. While the church underwent repairs, a new convento had to be built. Fr. Ramon Sanchez took over the parish in 1856 and continued the restoration work on the church, with the completion of the convent and tower, he also added a baptistery to the church in 1868; that was fitted with a marble font in 1878. Fray Bruno Laredo (1870-1884) improved both church and convent, rebuilding the bamboo sacristy in stone, and commencing the work on the transept. During the term of Fr. Vicente Maril (1884-1887), the roof of the church was replaced by galvanized iron. Fr. Victoriano Perez (1890 to 1896) restored the L-shaped convent and completed works on the transept and dome.

The 1898 revolution expelled the Spanish friars from the Philippines, the last Spanish parish priest being Fray Manuel de Arostegui of the Order of Saint Augustine, bears the last entry on the Book of Baptism dated May 28, 1898. He was replaced by Fr. Vicente Jose Romero who became the parish priest of the town.

On April 1, 1899, the Filipino Secular priest Juan Gernonimo Luna, a native of the San Jose, was appointed parish priest. In 1900 American troops occupied the convento and converted it into a military hospital for some time. In 1911 there were no more Filipino priest available in San Jose, a Capuchin friar was called to administer the parish. From July 1911 to 1915, the Missionaries of the Sacred Heart stayed in San Jose, where they set up a small major seminary. The seminary was short-lived for the MSH left the diocese in 1915. In 1915 Bishop Giuseppe Petrelli invited the Oblates of St. Joseph, the first Oblates arrived in Manila by ship on August 25, 1915 and took the train to San Jose where they were welcomed with the prolonged ringing of bells. Since then, they have been in charge of the parish of San Jose. Fr. Jose Anfossi became the parish priest, with the responsibility also for Cuenca, until his death in August 1921. Fr. Eugenio Gherlone immediately began the reconstruction of the church. His successor Fr. Luis Mortera finished the reconstruction of the church, which was beautified by paintings of St. Joseph, Fr. Luis was also responsible for the setting up the communion rails and lowering the windows for better light and ventilation.

In 1968 Fr. Lucio Aguilar and his parochial vicar Fr, Raymundo G. de La Cruz began a major reconstruction, The leaking roof was repaired, the windows lowered for more ventilation, the altar area and communion rails redecorated, new murals were painted, and was concluded by a blessing on April 26, 1970.

In 2000, the parish has retaken possession of the convent, which had long been used by the Cursillo movement as venue for its retreats. Fr. Rony Alkonga, OSJ began the much needed repair on the roof and ceiling as well as a redesigning of the area to accommodate, among others, a parish museum. The church was beautified. The adoration chapel, and Jubilee stage were constructed. The altars were restored and additional murals, painted.

On March 19, 2001, during the term of Rev. Fr. Joey Apin, OSJ as parish priest, the church of San Jose was proclaimed by Archbishop Gaudencio Rosales as an Archdiocesan Shrine.

References

External links

Roman Catholic churches in Batangas
Roman Catholic churches completed in 1765
1760s establishments in the Philippines
Marked Historical Structures of the Philippines
National Cultural Treasures of the Philippines
Spanish Colonial architecture in the Philippines
Baroque church buildings in the Philippines
18th-century Roman Catholic church buildings in the Philippines
Josephian churches in the Philippines
Neoclassical church buildings in the Philippines
Churches in the Roman Catholic Archdiocese of Lipa